Iphigénie Chrysochoou (1909-2008) was a Greek writer. She produced a significant body of works across her career.

Biography 
Chrysochoou was born in Menemen in the Ottoman Empire in 1909. During her early life, she studied foreign language and music. In 1938 she published her first work, a personal narrative, which was published in a Macedonian journal. In addition to writing over a dozen works, Iphigénie work with in the radio industry and as a translator. She worked with a Balkans radio station in the late 1940s, and with Radio Vienna from 1951 to 1954. In recognition for her writings, Chrysochoou was awarded numerous honors in and outside of Greece; she was a member of the Union of Foreign Journalists of Austria, and was at one point the President of the Society of Greek Writers.

References 

1909 births
2008 deaths
20th-century Greek women writers
Greek expatriates in Austria
People from Menemen